Gordon Boyd (8 March 1905 - 21 February 1980) was a Scotland international rugby union player.

Rugby Union career

Amateur career

He played for Glasgow HSFP.

He was part of the Glasgow HSFP side that shared the 1923-24 Scottish Unofficial Championship season title with Glasgow Academicals. Boyd scored 28 tries that season, including 6 in one match and 4 in another.

The Chocolate and Gold history of Glasgow HSFP recalls:
He was a very elusive winger who, though not lightning fast, had a fine swerve and played at centre and stand-off when required.

Provincial career

He played for the Whites Trial side on 15 December 1924.

International career

He was capped by Scotland just the once, in 1926, to play against England at Twickenham.

Family

His father was David Mitchell Boyd who died in 1955.

Gordon Boyd married Hannah Margaret Allison Murdoch (1907-1980) on 10 November 1934 in Yangon, Burma.

References

1905 births
1980 deaths
Glasgow HSFP players
Rugby union players from Glasgow
Scotland international rugby union players
Scottish rugby union players
Whites Trial players
Rugby union wings